Syed Mohammad Ziaul Haque is a Bangladesh Army officer and a fugitive. He was one of the main plotters of the 2011 Bangladesh coup d'état attempt. He is a top military commander of the Al-Qaeda linked Ansarullah Bangla Team, which has carried out terror attacks in Bangladesh.

Early life
Haque was born in the village of Mostafapur, Moulvibazar District, Sylhet Division, Bangladesh. He completed his schooling at Uttara Holy Child School and College and Sylhet Cadet College. His father, Syed Zillul Haque, is a businessman. He is a practicing Muslim. He became more fundamentalist after his wife died of cancer.

Career
Haque joined the Bangladesh Army through the 41st long course of the Bangladesh Military Academy. He studied in the Military Institute of Science and Technology. He was described as being "intelligent" and "skilled in IT". 

He played a key role in the organization of the 2011 Bangladesh coup d'état attempt, contacting army officers in different cantonments asking them to take part in the coup to establish an Islamic state. The coup was aided by the branch of pan-Islamist Hizb ut-Tahrir Bangladesh branch. He started in the engineers corp and trained in special operations. He went on the run after the coup attempt failed. 

Haque joined Ansarullah Bangla Team and quickly rose through their ranks. The leaders of Jamaat’ul-Mujahideen Bangladesh and Ansarullah Bangla Team had a meeting inside the Kashimpur high security jail and agreed to work together. Jamaat’ul-Mujahideen wanted Major Zia to help them with their bombmaking skills. 

In 2016, the government of Bangladesh announced a 4 million Taka bounty on him.

On 16 February 2021, Haque was sentenced to death by a court in Bangladesh for his role in the murder of Avijit Roy.

References

Living people
Bangladesh Army officers
Bangladeshi Islamists
Sunni Islamists
Year of birth missing (living people)
People from Moulvibazar Sadar Upazila